Laced is the debut album by the nu metal band Reveille, from Harvard, Massachusetts. It was released on June 22, 1999, through Elektra Records. The album contains the majority of the songs from the six-track demo that initially got the attention of major label Elektra.

The band members were all between the ages of 16 and 19 when the album was recorded.

The album artwork was created by Clive Barker. The album had sold over 100,000 copies before the release of Bleed the Sky.

Critical reception
CMJ New Music Monthly wrote that "Reveille is to Rage Against The Machine what Silverchair was to Nirvana, but the blatant aural similarities don't necessarily mean that Reveille should be pigeonholed as a cheap knockoff."

Track listing

Personnel 
Drew Simollardes – vocals
Steve Miloszewski – guitar
Greg Sullivan – guitar
Carl Randolph – bass
Justin Wilson – drums

References

1999 albums
Reveille (band) albums